Vexillum adamsianum is a species of small sea snail, marine gastropod mollusk in the family Costellariidae, the ribbed miters.

Description
The length of the shell attains 11.2 mm.

Distribution
This marine species was found of Hawaii, Tahiti and Mozambique.

References

 Turner H. 2001. Katalog der Familie Costellariidae Macdonald, 1860. Conchbooks. 1-100 page(s): 14
 Poppe G.T., Guillot de Suduiraut E. & Tagaro S.P. (2006) New Costellariidae from the Philippines. Visaya 1(6): 104–113.

External links
 Cernohorsky W.O. (1978) New species of Mitridae, Costellariidae, and Turridae from the Hawaiian Islands with notes in Mitra sphoni in the Galapagos Islands. The Nautilus 92(3): 61–67. [27 April 1978 page(s): 64]

adamsianum
Gastropods described in 1978